The canton of Annonay-2 is an administrative division of the Ardèche department, southern France. It was created at the French canton reorganisation which came into effect in March 2015. Its seat is in Annonay.

It consists of the following communes:
 
Annonay (partly)
Monestier
Roiffieux
Saint-Julien-Vocance
Talencieux
Thorrenc
Vanosc
Vernosc-lès-Annonay
Villevocance
Vocance

References

Cantons of Ardèche